Orlando Alejandro Borda Casafranca, who used the nom de guerre Comrade Alipio, was a Shining Path commander and one of the highest-ranking members of the Shining Path. He was killed on 11 August 2013 in a Peruvian army operation in Llochegua.

References

Peruvian communists
Alipio,Comrade
Peruvian guerrillas killed in action
Members of the Shining Path
2013 deaths
1967 births